Christian anarchism is a Christian movement in political theology that claims anarchism is inherent in Christianity and the Gospels. It is grounded in the belief that there is only one source of authority to which Christians are ultimately answerable—the authority of God as embodied in the teachings of Jesus. It therefore rejects the idea that human governments have ultimate authority over human societies. Christian anarchists denounce the state, believing it is violent, deceitful and idolatrous.

Christian anarchists hold that the "Kingdom of God" is the proper expression of the relationship between God and humanity. Under the "Kingdom of God", human relationships would be characterized by horizontal organization, servant leadership, and universal compassion-not through the traditional structures of organized religion, which most Christian anarchists consider hierarchical and or authoritarian structures. Most Christian anarchists are also pacifists who reject war, militarism, and the use of violence.

More than any other Bible source, the Beatitudes are used as a basis for Christian anarchism. Leo Tolstoy's The Kingdom of God Is Within You is often regarded as a key text for modern Christian anarchism.

Origins

Old Testament 
Jacques Ellul, a French philosopher and Christian anarchist, notes that the final verse of the Book of Judges (Judges 21:25) states that there was no king in Israel and that "everyone did as they saw fit". Subsequently, as recorded in the first Book of Samuel (1 Samuel 8) the people of Israel wanted a king "so as to be like other nations".

God declared that the people had rejected him as their king. He warned that a human king would lead to militarism, conscription and taxation, and that their pleas for mercy from the king's demands would go unanswered. Samuel passed on God's warning to the Israelites but they still demanded a king, and Saul became their ruler. Much of the subsequent Old Testament chronicles the Israelites trying to live with this decision.

New Testament 

More than any other Bible source, the Sermon on the Mount is used as the basis for Christian anarchism. Alexandre Christoyannopoulos explains that the Sermon perfectly illustrates Jesus's central teaching of love and forgiveness. Christian anarchists claim that the state, founded on violence, contravenes the Sermon and Jesus' call to love one's enemies.

The gospels tell of Jesus's temptation in the desert. For the final temptation, Jesus is taken up to a high mountain by Satan and told that if he bows down to Satan he will give him all the kingdoms of the world. Christian anarchists use this as evidence that all Earthly kingdoms and governments are ruled by Satan, otherwise they would not be Satan's to give. Jesus refuses the temptation, choosing to serve God instead, implying that Jesus is aware of the corrupting nature of Earthly power.

Christian eschatology and various Christian anarchists, such as Jacques Ellul, have identified the state and political power as the Beast in the Book of Revelation.

Friedrich Nietzsche and Frank Seaver Billings criticize Christianity and anarchism by arguing that they are the same thing.

Early Church 

According to Alexandre Christoyannopoulos, several of the Church Fathers' writings suggest anarchism as God's ideal. The first Christians opposed the primacy of the state: "We must obey God as ruler rather than men" (Acts 4:19, 5:29, 1 Corinthians 6:1-6); "Stripping the governments and the authorities bare, he exhibited them in open public as conquered, leading them in a triumphal procession by means of it." (Colossians 2:15). Also, some early Christian communities appear to have practised anarchist communism, such as the Jerusalem group described in Acts, who shared their money and labour equally and fairly among the members. Roman Montero claims that using an anthropological framework, such as that of the anarchist David Graeber, one can plausibly reconstruct the communism of the early Christian communities and that the practices were widespread, long-lasting, and substantial. Christian anarchists, such as Kevin Craig, insist that the communities were centred on true love and care for one another, rather than liturgy. They also allege that the reason for the early Christians were persecuted was not that they worshipped Jesus Christ but that they refused to worship human idols claiming divine status (see Imperial cult). Since they refused to worship the Roman Emperor, they refused to swear any oath of allegiance to the Roman Empire. When requested that he swear by the emperor, Speratus, spokesperson of the Scillitan Martyrs, said in 180CE, "I recognize not the empire of this world... because I know my Lord, the King of kings and Emperor of all nations.

In his introduction to a translation of the Sayings of the Desert Fathers, Thomas Merton describes the early monastics as "Truly in certain sense 'anarchists,' and it will do no harm to think of them as such."

During the Ante-Nicene Period, there were several independent sects who took a radically different approach to Christianity from that of the Proto-Orthodox Church and displayed anarchist tendencies by relying on direct revelation, rather than scripture, such as:
 Gnosticism, particularly Valentinianism (2nd to 4th centuries) – reliance on revealed knowledge from a transcendent, unknowable God, who was a distinct divinity from the Demiurge who created and oversees the material world.
 Montanism (2nd century) – relied on prophetic revelations from the Holy Spirit.

Conversion of the Roman Empire 

For Christian anarchists, the moment that epitomised the degeneration of Christianity was the conversion of Emperor Constantine after his victory at the Battle of the Milvian Bridge in 312. Christianity was then legalized under the Edict of Milan in 313, which hastened the Church's transformation from a humble bottom-up sect to an authoritarian top-down organization. Christian anarchists point out that marked the beginning of the "Constantinian shift" in which Christianity gradually came to be identified with the will of the ruling elite by becoming the state church of the Roman Empire and in some cases (such as the Crusades, Inquisition, and the French Wars of Religion) a religious justification for violence.

Peasant revolts in the Post-Reformation era 

Various libertarian socialist authors have identified the written work of the English Protestant social reformer Gerrard Winstanley and the social activism of his group, the Diggers, as anticipating their line of thought. For the anarchist historian George Woodcock, "Although (Pierre Joseph) Proudhon was the first writer to call himself an anarchist, at least two predecessors outlined systems that contain all the basic elements of anarchism. The first was Gerrard Winstanley (1609–1676), a linen draper who led the small movement of the Diggers during the Commonwealth. Winstanley and his followers protested in the name of a radical Christianity against the economic distress that followed the Civil War and against the inequality that the grandees of the New Model Army seemed intent on preserving.

In 1649–1650, the Diggers squatted on stretches of common land in southern England and attempted to set up communities based on work on the land and the sharing of goods. The communities failed following a crackdown by the English authorities, but a series of pamphlets by Winstanley survived, of which The New Law of Righteousness (1649) was the most important. Advocating a rational Christianity, Winstanley equated Christ with “the universal liberty” and declared the universally corrupting nature of authority. He saw “an equal privilege to share in the blessing of liberty” and detected an intimate link between the institution of property and the lack of freedom." For Murray Bookchin "In the modern world, anarchism first appeared as a movement of the peasantry and yeomanry against declining feudal institutions. In Germany its foremost spokesman during the Peasant Wars was Thomas Müntzer; in England, Gerrard Winstanley, a leading participant in the Digger movement. The concepts held by Müntzer and Winstanley were superbly attuned to the needs of their time — a historical period when the majority of the population lived in the countryside and when the most militant revolutionary forces came from an agrarian world. It would be painfully academic to argue whether Müntzer and Winstanley could have achieved their ideals. What is of real importance is that they spoke to their time; their anarchist concepts followed naturally from the rural society that furnished the bands of the peasant armies in Germany and the New Model in England."

Modern era 

The 19th-century Christian abolitionists Adin Ballou and William Lloyd Garrison were critical of all human governments and believed that they would be eventually supplanted by a new order in which individuals are guided solely by their love for God. Ballou and Garrison advocated Christian nonresistance to evil, as they saw Christ as the embodiment of "passive nonresistance," or nonviolent praxis against the state. They both condemned violence against southern slave owners and advocated instead for moral suasion or consistent rebukes against the institution of slavery in efforts to persuade racist southerns and indifferent northerners to the abolitionist' cause. At the outbreak of the Civil War, however, Garrison later embraced the armed struggle for black liberation and the Lincoln administration. Ballou remained a lifelong pacifist and condemned the Civil War for fear of the eventual retaliation by white southerns on freed black Americans.

Ballou's and Garrison's writings heavily influenced Leo Tolstoy, who was inspired by their lifelong commitment to abolitionism. Tolstoy wrote extensively on his burgeoning Christian anarchist principles in nonfiction books like The Kingdom of God is Within You, which is considered a key Christian anarchist text. Tolstoy sought to separate Russian Orthodox Christianity, which was merged with the state, from what he believed was the true message of Jesus as contained in the Gospels, specifically in the Sermon on the Mount. He took the viewpoint that all governments that wage war and churches that in turn support those governments, are an affront to the Christian principles of nonviolence. Although Tolstoy never actually used the term "Christian anarchism" in The Kingdom of God Is Within You, reviews of the book after its publication in 1894 appear to have coined the term.

The antireligious former priest Thomas J. Hagerty was a primary author of the Industrial Workers of the World (IWW) Preamble ("an injury to one is an injury to all"). IWW members included Christian anarchists like Dorothy Day and Ammon Hennacy.

Dorothy Day was a journalist turned social activist who became known for her social justice campaigns in defense of the poor. Alongside Peter Maurin, she founded the Catholic Worker Movement in 1933, which espoused nonviolence and hospitality for the impoverished and the downtrodden. Day was declared Servant of God when a cause for sainthood was opened for her by Pope John Paul II. Day's distributist economic views are very similar to Proudhon's mutualism by which she was influenced. Day also named the phrase "precarious work." based on the former anarchocommunist Léonce Crenier's embrace of poverty. Peter Maurin's vision to transform the social order consisted of establishing urban houses of hospitality to care for the destitute, rural farming communities to teach city dwellers agrarianism and encourage a movement back-to-the-land, and roundtable discussions in community centres to clarify thought and initiate action.

Simone Weil was a French philosopher who was very early animated by a great compassion for the exploited. She was first a socialist and then an anarchist. In 1930s, she converted to "love of Christ." During her experience, she explains that she suddenly felt that Christianity was the religion of the slaves and that she, like other slaves, could not resist adhering to it. She is considered a "Christian mystic" and an "anarchist Christian".

Anarchist biblical views and practices

Church authority 
With some notable exceptions such as the Catholic Worker Movement, many Christian anarchists are critical of Church dogma and rituals. Christian anarchists tend to wish that Christians were less preoccupied with performing rituals and preaching dogmatic theology, and more with following Jesus' teaching and practices. Jacques Ellul and Dave Andrews claim that Jesus did not intend to be the founder of an institutional religion, while Michael Elliot believes one of Jesus' intentions was to bypass human intermediaries and do away with priests.

Pacifism and nonviolence 

Christian anarchists, such as David Lipscomb, Leo Tolstoy, Ammon Hennacy, Jacques Ellul, and Dave Andrews, follow Jesus' call to not resist evil but turn the other cheek. They argue that this teaching can only imply a condemnation of the state, as the police and army hold a monopoly over the legitimate use of force. They believe freedom will only be guided by the grace of God if they show compassion to others and turn the other cheek when confronted with violence. Christian anarchists believe violence begets violence and the ends never justify the means.

Many Christian anarchists practice the principles of nonviolence, nonresistance, and turning the other cheek. To illustrate how nonresistance works in practice, Alexandre Christoyannopoulos offers the following Christian anarchist response to terrorism:

Simple living 

Christian anarchists such as Ammon Hennacy, Peter Maurin and Dorothy Day often advocate voluntary poverty. This can be for a variety of reasons, such as withdrawing support for government by reducing taxable income or following Jesus' teachings. Jesus appears to teach voluntary poverty when he told his disciples, "It is easier for a camel to go through the eye of a needle than for a rich man to enter the kingdom of God" (Mark 10:25) and "You cannot serve both God and Mammon" (Luke 16:13).

State authority 
The most common challenge for anarchist theologians is interpreting Paul's Epistle to the Romans 13:1–7, in which Paul demanded obedience to governing authorities and described them as God's servants exacting punishment on wrongdoers. Romans 13:1–7 holds the most explicit reference to the state in the New Testament but other parallel texts include Titus 3:1, Hebrews 13:17 and 1 Peter 2:13-17.

Some theologians, such as C.E.B. Cranfield, have interpreted Romans 13:1–7 to mean the Church should support the state, as God has sanctified the state to be his main tool to preserve social order. Similarly, in the case of the state being involved in a "just war", some theologians argue that it's permissible for Christians to serve the state and wield the sword. Christian anarchists do not share these interpretations of Romans 13 but still recognize it as "a very embarrassing passage."

Christian anarchists and pacifists such as Jacques Ellul and Vernard Eller do not attempt to overthrow the state given Romans 13 and Jesus' command to turn the other cheek. As wrath and vengeance are contrary to the Christian values of kindness and forgiveness, Ellul neither supports, nor participates in, the state. Eller articulates this position by restating the passage this way:

Christians who interpret Romans 13 as advocating support for governing authorities are left with the difficulty of how to act under tyrants or dictators. Ernst Käsemann, in his Commentary on Romans, challenged the mainstream Christian interpretation of the passage in light of German Lutheran Churches using this passage to justify the Holocaust.

Paul's letter to Roman Christians declares "For rulers hold no terror for those who do right, but for those who do wrong." However Christian anarchists point out an inconsistency if this text were to be taken literally and in isolation as Jesus and Paul were both executed by the governing authorities or "rulers" even though they did "right." The content of Paul's letter to the Romans is also denied by Paul himself in the same letter's 12:2 verse: "Do not conform to this world's system of things, but change yourselves by using your own intellect, so that you shall understand by yourselves the good and perfect will of God." In his Epistle to the Ephesians, 6:12, Paul states: "For our struggle is not against flesh and blood, but against the rulers, against the authorities, against the powers of this world's obscurantism".

There are also Christians anarchists such as Leo Tolstoy and Ammon Hennacy, who favor Jesuism and do not see the need to integrate Paul's teachings into their subversive way of life. Tolstoy believed Paul was instrumental in the church's "deviation" from Jesus' teaching and practices whilst Hennacy believed "Paul spoiled the message of Christ". In contrast to Eller, Hennacy and Ciaron O'Reilly advocate nonviolent civil disobedience to confront state oppression.

Swearing of oaths 
In the Sermon on the Mount (Matthew 5:33-37), Jesus tells his followers to not swear oaths in the name of God or Man. Tolstoy, Adin Ballou and Petr Chelčický understand this to mean that Christians should never bind themselves to any oath as they may not be able to fulfil the will of God if they are bound to the will of a fellow-man. Tolstoy takes the view that all oaths are evil, but especially an oath of allegiance.

Tax 
Some Christian anarchists resist taxes in the belief that their government is engaged in immoral, unethical or destructive activities such as war, and paying taxes inevitably funds these activities, whilst others submit to taxation. Adin Ballou wrote that if the act of resisting taxes requires physical force to withhold what a government tries to take, then it is important to submit to taxation. Ammon Hennacy, who, like Ballou also believed in nonresistance, eased his conscience by simply living below the income tax threshold.

Christian anarchists do not interpret the injunction in Matthew 22:21 to "give to Caesar what is Caesar's" as advocating support for taxes, but as further advice to free oneself from material attachment. For example, Dorothy Day said if we were to give everything to God there will be nothing left for Caesar, and Jacques Ellul believed the passage showed that Caesar may have rights over fiat money but not things that are made by God, as he explained:

Vegetarianism 

Vegetarianism in the Christian tradition has a long history commencing in the first centuries of Church with the Desert Fathers and Desert Mothers who abandoned the "world of men" for intimacy with the God of Jesus Christ. Vegetarianism amongst hermits and Christian monastics in the Eastern Christian and Roman Catholic traditions remains common to this day as a means of simplifying one's life, and as a practice of asceticism. Leo Tolstoy, Ammon Hennacy, and Théodore Monod extended their belief in nonviolence and compassion to all living beings through vegetarianism.

Present-day Christian anarchist groups

Brotherhood Church 
The Brotherhood Church is a Christian anarchist and pacifist community. The Brotherhood Church can be traced back to 1887 when a Congregationalist minister called John Bruce Wallace started a magazine called "The Brotherhood" in Limavady, Northern Ireland. An intentional community with Quaker origins has been located at Stapleton, near Pontefract, Yorkshire, since 1921.

Catholic Worker Movement 

Established by Peter Maurin and Dorothy Day in the early 1930s, the Catholic Worker Movement is a Christian movement dedicated to nonviolence, personalism and voluntary poverty. Over 130 Catholic Worker communities exist in the United States where "houses of hospitality" care for the homeless. The Joe Hill House of hospitality (which closed in 1968) in Salt Lake City, Utah featured an enormous twelve feet by fifteen foot mural of Jesus Christ and Joe Hill. Present-day Catholic Workers include Ciaron O'Reilly, an Irish-Australian civil rights and anti-war activist.

Anne Klejment, professor of history at University of St. Thomas, wrote of the Catholic Worker Movement:

The Catholic Worker Movement has consistently protested against war and violence for over seven decades. Many of the leading figures in the movement have been both anarchists and pacifists, as Ammon Hennacy explains:

Maurin and Day were both baptized and confirmed in the Catholic Church and believed in the institution, thus showing it is possible to be a Christian anarchist and still choose to remain within a church. After her death, Day was proposed for sainthood by the Claretian Missionaries in 1983. Pope John Paul II granted the Archdiocese of New York permission to open Day's cause for sainthood in March 2000, calling her a Servant of God.

In literature, in Michael Paraskos's 2017 novel, Rabbitman, a political satire prompted by Donald Trump's presidency, the heroine, called Angela Witney, is a member of an imagined Catholic Worker commune located in the southern English village of Ditchling, where the artist Eric Gill once lived.

Doukhobors

Online communities 

Numerous Christian anarchist websites, social networking sites, forums, electronic mailing lists and blogs have emerged on the internet over the last few years. These include: The AnarchoChristian Podcast and Website, Biblical Anarchy: Obey God Rather Than Men, The Libertarian Christian Institute, started by Norman Horn, A Pinch of Salt, a 1980s Christian anarchist magazine, revived in 2006 by Keith Hebden as a blog and bi-annual magazine; Libera Catholick Union founded in 1988 and re-organized in 2019; Jesus Radicals founded by Mennonites in 2000; Lost Religion of Jesus created in 2005; Christian Anarchists created in 2006; The Mormon Worker, a blog and newspaper, founded in 2007 to promote Mormonism, anarchism and pacifism; and Academics and Students Interested in Religious Anarchism (ASIRA) founded by Alexandre Christoyannopoulos in 2008.

Other

Criticism 
Critics of Christian anarchism include both Christians and anarchists. Christians often cite Romans 13 as evidence that the State should be obeyed, while secular anarchists do not believe in any authority including God as per the slogan "no gods, no masters". Christian anarchists often believe Romans 13 is taken out of context, emphasizing that Revelation 13 and Isaiah 13, among other passages, are needed to fully understand Romans 13 text.

See also 

 Anarchism and Islam
 Anarchism and Orthodox Judaism
 Anarchism and religion
 Christianity and politics
 Christian libertarianism
 Christian communism
 Christian socialism
 Distributism
 Liberation theology
 New Monasticism
 Plowshares movement
 Postmodern theology
 Radical Reformation
 Render unto Caesar
 Statolatry
 Theonomy
 Tolstoyan movement
 Utopian socialism

References

Bibliography

Further reading

19th century 

 Ernest Renan (1863) The Life of Jesus.
 Leo Tolstoy (1886–94) What I Believe; and The Kingdom of God Is Within You.
 Friedrich Engels (1894) A Contribution to the History of Primitive Christianity.

20th century 

 Elbert Hubbard (1910) Jesus Was An Anarchist (originally titled The Better Part).
 Ammon Hennacy (1954) The Autobiography of a Catholic Anarchist (reprinted in 1965 as The Book of Ammon). 
 Archie Penner (1959) The Christian, The State, and the New Testament (reprinted in 2000 as The New Testament, the Christian, and the State).
 Ruth Gilmore (1970) The Christian Anarchists: Ruskin and Tolstoy, and a Consideration of Their Influence on Gandhi.
 Niels Kjaer (1972) Kristendom og Anarkisme (translated as Christianity and Anarchism).
 Mary Segers (1977) Equality and Christian Anarchism: The Political and Social Ideas of the Catholic Worker Movement.
 Vernard Eller (1987) Christian Anarchy: Jesus' Primacy Over the Powers. 
 Linda H. Damico (1987) The Anarchist Dimension of Liberation Theology. 
 Jacques Ellul (1988) Anarchy and Christianity. 
 Patrick Coy, et al. (1988) A Revolution of the Heart: Essays on the Catholic Worker . 
 Michael C. Elliott (1990) Freedom, Justice and Christian Counter-Culture. 
 George Tarleton (1993) Birth of a Christian Anarchist.
 Dave Andrews (1999) Christi-Anarchy: Discovering a Radical Spirituality of Compassion.

21st century 

 Frederick G. Boehrer (2001) Christian Anarchism and the Catholic Worker Movement: Roman Catholic Authority and Identity in the United States.
 Jonathan Bartley (2006) Faith and Politics After Christendom: The Church as a Movement for Anarchy. 
 Ted Lewis ed. (2008) Electing Not to Vote: Christian Reflections on Reasons for Not Voting 
 Shane Claiborne (2008) Jesus for President: Politics for Ordinary Radicals. 
 Tripp York (2009) Living on Hope While Living in Babylon: The Christian Anarchists of the 20th Century. 
 David Alan Black (2009) Christian Archy. 
 Alexandre Christoyannopoulos (2010) Christian Anarchism: A Political Commentary on the Gospel. 
 Ronald E. Osborn (2010) Anarchy and Apocalypse: Essays on Faith, Violence, and Theodicy. 
 Keith Hebden (2011–13) Dalit Theology and Christian Anarchism.  and Seeking Justice: The Radical Compassion of Jesus.  
 Tom O'Golo (2011) Christ? No! Jesus? Yes!: A Radical Reappraisal of a Very Important Life. 
 Jacques de Guillebon and Falk van Gaver (2012) L'anarchisme chrétien (translated as Christian anarchism). 
 Mark Van Steenwyk (2012–13) That Holy Anarchist: Reflections on Christianity & Anarchism.  and The Kingdom of God: Embracing the Subversive Power of Repentance. 
 Noel Moules (2012) Fingerprints of Fire, Footprints of Peace: A Spiritual Manifesto from a Jesus Perspective. 
 Davor Džalto (2016) Anarchism and Orthodoxy  .
 Davor Džalto (2021) Anarchy and the Kingdom of God: From Eschatology to Orthodox Political Theology and Back  .
 Montero, Roman A. 2017. All Things in Common: The Economic Practices of the Early Christians. Eugene, OR: Wipf & Stock. 
 Beno Profetyk (2017) Christocrate, la logique de l'anarchisme chrétien 
 Beno Profetyk (2020) Credo du Christocrate – Christocrat's creed (Bilingual French-English edition)

External links 

 Works on Christian anarchism at Internet Archive
 Books on Christian anarchism at the Open Library
 "Union Square Speech", Dorothy Day, November 6, 1965
 Commentary: John 18:33-38, Ollie Harrison, Third Way Magazine, February 1996
 Christian Anarchism: A Revolutionary Reading of the Bible, Alexandre Christoyannopoulos, World International Studies Conference (WISC), July 23–26, 2008
 Jesus Is an Anarchist, James Redford, Social Science Research Network (SSRN), October 17, 2009
 Was Jesus an anarchist? - interview with Alexandre Christoyannopoulos by William Crawley, BBC Northern Ireland, May 2011
 Jesus Radicals - A webzine exploring Christianity and anarchism
 Compassionistas - A resource for Spiritual Activism with some Christian Anarchist material 
 Christianarchism - An interpretation of Christian Anarchism
 Beno Hasopher - Webpage of Beno Hasopher, christian anarchist theologian 
 Maurin, Day, the Catholic Worker, and Anarcho-Distributism by Nicholas Evans 2018
 Pantarchy: Voluntary State and a New Catholic Church: Brief Overview of the Views of the Individualist Anarchist Stephen Pearl Andrews by Nicholas Evans 2018
 Catholic Freedom: Why Confession To A Priest Is Not Necessary To Have Sins Forgiven A Brief History of Confession from a Cafeteria Catholic Anarchist perspective by Nicholas Evans
 Jesus was an anarchist! - interview with Alexandre Christoyannopoulos by Matt Archer, June 2021

 
Anarchist schools of thought
Christianity and political ideologies